The 2004 Oakland Raiders season was the 45th of professional football for the Oakland Raiders franchise, their 35th season as members of the National Football League (NFL), and their ninth season since returning to Oakland. They were led by head coach Norv Turner in his first season as head coach of the Raiders. They played their home games at Network Associates Coliseum as member of the AFC West. They finished the season 5–11, finishing in last place in the AFC West for the first time since 1995.

Though Rich Gannon began the season as the Raiders starting quarterback, he suffered a neck injury in the third game of the season that would eventually lead to his retirement. For the second consecutive season, the Raiders suffered a five-game losing streak in the middle of the season. They only won one game by a touchdown or more, defeating their Super Bowl XXXVII opponent, the Tampa Bay Buccaneers, 20–10.

The team lost two of their starting receivers from the 2002 team: Tim Brown was released and signed with the Tampa Bay Buccaneers and Jerry Rice was traded to the Seattle Seahawks midseason.

Previous season 
The Raiders finished the 2003 season 4–12 to finish in a tie for last place in the AFC West. Following the season, Raider owner Al Davis fired head coach Bill Callahan after two years as head coach. A month later, the team named Norv Turner head coach.

Offseason

Free Agency

NFL draft

Staff

Roster 

|}

Regular season

Schedule and results

Select game summaries

Week 12 

    
    
    
    
    
    
    
    

 Kerry Collins 26/45, 339 Yds
 Jerry Porter 6 Rec, 135 Yds

Standings

References 

Oakland Raiders seasons
Oakland Raiders
Raiders
Oakland